Kholodny is an urban-type settlement in Magadan Oblast, Russia.  Population:

Geography
Kholodny is located around 380 km north-north-west of the city of Magadan, by the Byoryolyokh river in the Upper Kolyma Highlands. It is in Susumansky District, 14 km from the administrative centre Susuman.

History
The settlement was founded in 1941 as a gold mining base, gaining urban-type settlement status in 1962.  The settlement's name Kholodny is the Russian word for cold.

Infrastructure
Kholodny lies on the Kolyma Highway.

References

Urban-type settlements in Magadan Oblast